Billo may refer to:

Bilo, Ethiopia, a plain and village in the Oromo-held lands of Ethiopia formerly spelled Billo or Billò
Billo (film), a 1951 Punjabi film
Billo Barber, a 2008 Bollywood film
Billo De Ghar, an album by Abrar Ul Haq
Billo Frómeta, a Dominican musician
Billo, Grandes Éxitos (album), by Billo Frómeta
a nickname for Bill O'Reilly (political commentator)
a nickname for William Rees (rugby)